The Horizon Just Laughed is the thirteenth studio album by American rock musician Damien Jurado. It was released on May 4, 2018, by Secretly Canadian.

Release
On March 9, 2018, Jurado announced the release of his new album, along with the single "Over Rainbows And Ranier".

Critical reception

The Horizon Just Laughed was met with "universal acclaim" reviews from critics. At Metacritic, which assigns a weighted average rating out of 100 to reviews from mainstream publications, this release received an average score of 81 based on 11 reviews. Aggregator Album of the Year gave the release a 80 out of 100 based on a critical consensus of 9 reviews.

Track listing

Charts

References

2018 albums
Damien Jurado albums
Secretly Canadian albums